Cadence was a Canadian a cappella vocal group based in Toronto, Ontario. Nominated for the 2006 Juno Award for Best Vocal Jazz Album of the Year for their album "Twenty for One", they have produced five albums.

History
Cadence formed in 1998 by York University students Carl Berger, Ross Lynde, Daniel Galessiere, and Kevin Fox. In 2000 the group released an album, Frost Free, with a capella arrangements of popular pop and jazz songs. Their album Twenty For One was released in 2005.

In 2009, Cadence sang on Kristy Cardinelli's album My Romance. By 2007 Fox and Bell had left the group, and Aaron Jensen, and Kurt Sampson had joined; this lineup recorded the group's next album, Speak Easy.

Cadence toured and performed around Canada, as well as in the United States, Europe and Asia. Cadence was also active in music education, attending school functions and hosting a summer camp for a cappella musicians.

On October 21st 2020, Cadence announced via their Facebook page that the group would no longer be continuing.

Discography

References

External links
 http://www.cadence-unplugged.com (defunct)

Professional a cappella groups
Musical groups from Toronto
Musical groups established in 1998
1998 establishments in Ontario